Minnesota North College – Mesabi Range Eveleth, most recently known as Mesabi Range College (MRC) Eveleth campus, which was formerly known as Mesabi Range Community and Technical College) is a public community college campus located in Eveleth, Minnesota. In 2022, the board of trustees of the Minnesota State Colleges and Universities merged the college with Minnesota North College – Mesabi Range Virginia and several others into a single institution called Minnesota North College.

History 
The campus is named for the Mesabi Range, an iron-ore deposit in Minnesota's Iron Range where the campus and Minnesota North College – Mesabi Range Virginia are located.

Athletics
As part of Minnesota North College, a member of the Minnesota College Athletic Conference (MCAC) National Junior College Athletic Association (NJCAA), Norse Athletics include baseball, softball, football, men's basketball, women's basketball, and volleyball.

References

External links
 

Community colleges in Minnesota
Educational institutions established in 1925
Two-year colleges in the United States
Universities and colleges in St. Louis County, Minnesota
NJCAA athletics
Minnesota North College
Virginia, Minnesota
1925 establishments in Minnesota